Wang Zhaoyuan is the name of:

Wang Zhaoyuan (general) (died 975), Later Shu politician and general
Wang Zhaoyuan (scholar) (1763–1851), Qing dynasty Confucian scholar